As the center of Hurricane Katrina passed southeast of New Orleans on August 29, 2005, winds downtown were in the Category 1 range with frequent intense gusts. The storm surge caused approximately 23 breaches in the drainage canal and navigational canal levees and flood walls. As mandated in the Flood Control Act of 1965, responsibility for the design and construction of the city's levees belongs to the United States Army Corps of Engineers and responsibility for their maintenance belongs to the Orleans Levee Board. The failures of levees and flood walls during Katrina are considered by experts to be the worst engineering disaster in the history of the United States. By August 31, 2005, 80% of New Orleans was flooded, with some parts under  of water. The famous French Quarter and Garden District escaped flooding because those areas are above sea level. The major breaches included the 17th Street Canal levee, the Industrial Canal levee, and the London Avenue Canal flood wall. These breaches caused the majority of the flooding, according to a June 2007 report by the American Society of Civil Engineers. The flood disaster halted oil production and refining which increased oil prices worldwide.

Between 80 and 90 percent of the residents of New Orleans were evacuated before the hurricane struck, testifying to some of the success of the evacuation measures. Despite this, many remained in the city, mainly those who did not have access to personal vehicles or who were isolated from the dissemination of news from the local governments. The Louisiana Superdome was used to house and support some of those who were unable to evacuate. Television shots frequently focused on the Superdome as a symbol of the flooding occurring in New Orleans.

The disaster had major implications for a large segment of the population, economy, and politics of the entire United States. It has prompted a Congressional review of the Army Corps of Engineers and the failure of portions of the federally built flood protection system which experts agree should have protected the city's inhabitants from Katrina's surge. Katrina has also stimulated significant research in the academic community into urban planning, real estate finance, and economic issues in the wake of a natural disaster.

Background

New Orleans was settled on a natural high ground along the Mississippi River. Later developments that eventually extended to nearby Lake Pontchartrain were built on fill to bring them above the average lake level. Navigable commercial waterways extended from the lake into the interior of the city to promote waterborne commerce. After the construction of the Inner Harbor Navigation Canal in 1940, the state closed these waterways causing the town's water table to lower drastically.

In 1965, heavy flooding caused by Hurricane Betsy brought concerns regarding flooding from hurricanes to the forefront. That year, Congress passed the Flood Control Act of 1965 which, among other issues, gave authority for design and construction of the flood protection in the New Orleans metropolitan area to the United States Army Corps of Engineers, subject to cost sharing principles, some of which were waived by later legislation. The local municipalities were charged with maintenance once the projects were completed. After 1965, the corps built a levee system around a much larger geographic footprint that included previous marshland and swamp. Many new subdivisions were developed to cater to those who preferred a more suburban lifestyle but were open to remaining within the city limits of New Orleans. Historians question why the area farthest east was developed, since it was viable wetlands and because ringing this region with levees did nothing significant toward protecting the city. What expansion accomplished was to increase the amount of land that could be developed, and it was a reason for the Army Corps to expand the size of its project.

Forty nine percent lies below sea level, in places to equivalent depths.

When authorized, the flood control design and construction were projected to take 13 years to complete. When Katrina made landfall in 2005, the project was between 60 and 90% complete with a projected date of completion estimated for 2015, nearly 50 years after authorization. Hurricane Georges in September 1998 galvanized some scientists, engineers and politicians into collective planning, with Scientific American declaring that "New Orleans is a disaster waiting to happen" in October 2001. However, even the most insistent calls from officials to evacuate ahead of Katrina did not warn that the levees could breach.

On August 29, 2005, the flood walls and levees catastrophically failed throughout the metro area. Many collapsed well below design thresholds (e.g., 17th Street and London Canals). Others (like the Industrial Canal) collapsed after a brief period of overtopping caused “scouring” or erosion of the earthen levee walls. In eastern New Orleans, levees along the Gulf Intracoastal Waterway failed in several places because they were built with sand and erodible materials instead of clay, an obvious construction flaw.

History of New Orleans’ Law Enforcement Offices 
Prior to Hurricane Katrina, New Orleans’ law enforcement was in disarray. It was inundated with corruption from higher-up officials and had underpaid officers manning the streets. This enforcement lacked the trust of its citizens and failed to keep police brutality rates low. The city's lack of organization caused the New Orleans Police Department (NOPD) and its prison, Orleans Parish Prison (OPP), to have insufficient funding for proper equipment and emergency planning. Along with the law enforcement, the city's district attorney's office had very little funding as well. Each prosecutor was only paid $30,000 starting off and the public defenders only $29,000. These public defenders' income came from the traffic tickets and court fees of the city residents. These earnings were oftentimes very inconsistent, in turn causing these low wages. New Orleans only had 30 public defenders to handle all of its cases annually. In the days leading up to the storm, the lack of preparation at Orleans Parish Prison caused the overlooking of evacuation plans. This absence of preparation later led to the suffering of its prisoners during one of America's most damaging hurricanes.

Pre-Katrina preparations

The eye of Hurricane Katrina was forecast to pass through the city of New Orleans. In that event, the wind was predicted to come from the north as the storm passed, forcing large volumes of water from Lake Pontchartrain against the levees and possibly into the city.

On August 28, at 10:00 a.m. CDT, the National Weather Service (NWS) field office in New Orleans issued a bulletin predicting catastrophic damage to New Orleans and the surrounding region. Anticipated effects included, at the very least, the partial destruction of half of the well-constructed houses in the city, severe damage to most industrial buildings, rendering them inoperable, the "total destruction" of all wood-framed low-rise apartment buildings, all windows blowing out in high-rise office buildings, and the creation of a huge debris field of trees, telephone poles, cars, and collapsed buildings. Lack of clean water was predicted to "make human suffering incredible by modern standards."

It was also predicted that the standing water caused by the storm surge would render most of the city uninhabitable for weeks and that the destruction of oil and petrochemical refineries in the surrounding area would spill waste into the floodwaters. The resulting mess would coat every surface, converting the city into a toxic marsh until water could be drained. Some experts said that it could take six months or longer to pump all the water out of the city.

Evacuation order
On Saturday night, Max Mayfield, director of the National Hurricane Center, did something he had done only once before. He called the governors of Alabama, Louisiana, and Mississippi to warn them of the severity of the coming storm. He issued a special warning to Mayor Ray Nagin, telling him that some levees in the greater New Orleans area could be overtopped. Later, Mr. Mayfield would tell Brian Williams with NBC Nightly News that he went to bed that night believing he had done what he could. On Sunday, he made a video call to U.S. President George W. Bush at his farm in Crawford, Texas about the severity of the storm.

Many New Orleans residents took precautions to secure their homes and prepare for possible evacuation on Friday the 26th and Saturday the 27th. On August 27 the state of Louisiana was declared an emergency area by the Federal Government, and by mid-morning of that day, many local gas stations which were not yet out of gas had long lines. Nagin first called for a voluntary evacuation of the city at 5:00 p.m. on August 27 and subsequently ordered a citywide mandatory evacuation at 9:30 a.m. on August 28, the first such order in the city's history. In a live news conference, Mayor Nagin predicted that "the storm surge most likely will topple our levee system", and warned that oil production in the Gulf of Mexico would be shut down.

Many neighboring areas and parishes also called for evacuations. By mid-afternoon, officials in Plaquemines, St. Bernard, St. Charles, Lafourche, Terrebonne, Jefferson, St. Tammany, and Washington parishes had called for voluntary or mandatory evacuations."

Although Mayor Ray Nagin ordered a mandatory evacuation of the city, many people refused to leave or were unable to do so. In Plaquemines Parish, an official described those staying behind as "gambling with their own lives." Reasons were numerous, including a belief that their homes or the buildings in which they planned to stay offered sufficient protection, lack of financial resources or access to transportation, or a feeling of obligation to protect their property. These reasons were complicated by the fact that an evacuation the previous year for Hurricane Ivan had resulted in gridlocked traffic for six to ten hours. The fact that Katrina occurred at the end of the month before pay checks were in the hands of many was also significant. A "refuge of last resort" was designated at the Louisiana Superdome. Beginning at noon on August 28 and running for several hours, city buses were redeployed to shuttle local residents from 12 pickup points throughout the city to the "shelters of last resort."

By the time Hurricane Katrina came ashore early the next morning, Mayor Nagin estimated that approximately one million people had fled the city and its surrounding suburbs. By the evening of August 28, over 100,000 people remained in the city, with 20,000 taking shelter at the Louisiana Superdome, along with 300 National Guard troops. While supplies of MREs (Meals ready to eat) and bottled water were available at the Superdome, Nagin told survivors to bring blankets and enough food for several days, warning that it would not be a comfortable place.

Direct effects

Hurricane Katrina made its second and third landfalls in the Gulf Coast region on Monday, August 29, 2005, as a Category 3 hurricane. Later that day, area affiliates of local television station WDSU reported New Orleans was experiencing widespread flooding due to breaches of several Army Corps-built levees, was without power, and experienced several instances of catastrophic damage in residential and business areas. Entire neighborhoods on the south shore of Lake Pontchartrain were flooded.

The extensive flooding stranded many residents who were forced to stay in place long after Hurricane Katrina had passed. Those stranded survivors dotted the tops of houses citywide. Some were trapped inside attics and unable to escape. Many people chopped their way onto their roofs with hatchets and sledge hammers, which Mayor Nagin had urged residents to store in their attics in case of such events. Clean water was unavailable, and power outages lasted for weeks.

By 11:00 p.m. August 29, Mayor Nagin described the loss of life as "significant" with reports of bodies floating on the water throughout the city, primarily in the eastern portions. Some hotels and hospitals reported diesel fuel shortages. The National Guard began setting up temporary morgues in select locations to accommodate the bodies.

Communications failures
Coordination of rescue efforts in the aftermath of Katrina was difficult because of the disruption of the communications infrastructure. Cellular service and the Internet were inoperable because of line damages, destruction of base stations, or power failures, even though some base stations had their own back-up generators. In a number of cases, reporters were asked to brief public officials on the conditions in areas where information was not reaching them any other way.

All local television stations were disrupted. Local television stations and newspapers moved quickly to sister locations in nearby cities. New Orleans CBS-affiliate WWL-TV was the only local station to remain on the air during and after the storm, broadcasting from Baton Rouge. Broadcasting and publishing on the Internet became an important means of distributing information to evacuees and the rest of the world, with news networks citing blogs like Interdictor and Gulfsails for reports of what was happening in the city. Amateur radio provided tactical and emergency communications and handled health-and-welfare enquiries. By September 4, a temporary communications hub was set up at the Hyatt Hotel in downtown New Orleans.

The first television pictures out of New Orleans shown on national TV were from Houston's ABC owned and operated KTRK which flew its helicopter to New Orleans in the days after the storm.

Damage to buildings and roads

Most of the city's major roads were damaged. The only route out of the city was east to the West Bank of New Orleans on the Crescent City Connection bridge. The I-10 Twin Span Bridge traveling east towards Slidell suffered severe damage; 473 spans were separated from their supports and 64 spans dropped into the lake.

On August 29, at about 7:30 a.m. CDT, it was reported that most of the windows on the north side of the Hyatt Regency New Orleans had been blown out, and many other high rise buildings nearby also had extensive window damage. The Hyatt was the most severely damaged hotel in the city, with beds reported to be flying out of the windows. Insulation tubes were exposed as the hotel's glass exterior was completely sheared off.

Louis Armstrong New Orleans International Airport was closed before the storm but reported no flooding in airplane movement areas or inside of the terminal itself. By August 30, it was reopened to humanitarian and rescue operations. Commercial cargo flights resumed on September 10, and commercial passenger service resumed on September 13.

The Superdome sustained significant damage, including two sections of the waterproof membrane on the roof that were peeled off by the wind. On August 30, Louisiana Governor Kathleen Blanco ordered the complete evacuation of the remaining people that sought shelter in the Superdome. They were then transported to the Astrodome in Houston, Texas.

Charity Hospital sustained significant damage as well. It had most of its windows blown out and suffered ceiling tile and light fixture damage from the strong winds caused by Katrina. Later that day, rising floodwaters began to fill up the building, which caused the main generators to fail, so the hospital staff decided to evacuate everyone to the auditorium. Conditions in the auditorium began to deteriorate, so on September 1, the first 100 medically ill patients were taken by helicopter to Baton Rouge. The remaining persons were evacuated at about 3:00 pm the next day.

Because of the extensive damage Katrina caused to Six Flags New Orleans, which included flooding and corroded roller-coaster tracks, the theme park eventually became abandoned and was not repaired because it would be too expensive and the park was not very profitable. Several reopening or reparation proposals have been planned, but none of them were successful in following through. Reports suggest that the theme park will be demolished in the following years.

Levee failures

On Monday, August 29, 2005, the eye of Hurricane Katrina passed east of the city, subjecting it to hurricane wind conditions, but sparing New Orleans of the worst impact. The city seemed to have escaped most of the catastrophic wind damage and heavy rain that had been predicted. Most buildings held up well structurally.

However, the city's levee and flood walls designed and built by the US Army Corps of Engineers breached in over fifty locations. Additionally, the levees were built on soil that vary in compression and consolidation rates. Therefore, it is difficult to systematically predict subsidence of the ground under the levees. Storm surge breached the levees of the Mississippi River-Gulf Outlet Canal ("MR-GO") in approximately 20 places and flooded all of Saint Bernard Parish, the east bank of Plaquemines Parish and the historic Lower Ninth Ward. The major levee breaches in the city included breaches at the 17th Street Canal levee, the London Avenue Canal, and the wide, navigable Inner Harbor Navigation Canal, which left approximately 80% of New Orleans flooded. There were three major breaches at the Industrial Canal; one on the upper side near the junction with MR-GO, and two on the lower side along the Lower Ninth Ward, between Florida Avenue and Claiborne Avenue. The 17th Street Canal levee was breached on the lower (New Orleans West End) side inland from the Old Hammond Highway Bridge, and the London Avenue Canal breached in two places, on the upper side just back from Robert E. Lee Boulevard, and on the lower side a block in from the Mirabeau Avenue Bridge. Flooding from the breaches put the majority of the city under water for days, and in many places for weeks. Many roads and buildings were damaged by Hurricane Katrina.

In a June 2006 report on the disaster, the U.S. Army Corps of Engineers admitted that faulty design specifications, incomplete sections, and substandard construction of levee segments, contributed to the damage done to New Orleans by Hurricane Katrina. A report released by the American Society of Civil Engineers in June 2007 concluded that two-thirds of the flooding in the city could have been avoided if the levees had held.

The failure of the Hurricane Protection Project of New Orleans was the subject of at least two U.S. Senate committee hearings in November 2005. In 2006, the group Levees.org led by Sandy Rosenthal called for 8/29 Commission to investigate both the engineering and decision-making behind the collapse of a flood protection system that should have held against Katrina's storm surge and the Southeast Louisiana Flood Protection Authority-East, which oversees the region's levees, backed the call in 2008.

Loss of life

Preliminary reports indicate that the official death toll, according to the Louisiana Department of Health, was 1,464 people. The first deaths were reported shortly before midnight on August 28, 2005, as three nursing home patients died during an evacuation to Baton Rouge. On September 4, Mayor Nagin speculated that the death toll could rise as high as ten thousand after the clean-up was completed. Some survivors and evacuees reported seeing bodies lying in city streets and floating in still-flooded sections, especially in the east of the city. The advanced state of decomposition of many corpses, some of which were left in the water or sun for days before being collected, hindered efforts by coroners to identify many of the dead.

There were six deaths confirmed at the Superdome. Four of these were from natural causes, one was the result of a drug overdose, and one was a suicide. At the Convention Center, four bodies were recovered. One of these four is believed to be the result of a homicide. Body collection throughout the city began on approximately September 9. Prior to that date, the locations of corpses were recorded, but most were not retrieved.

Later studies determined that most of New Orleans' Katrina deaths were elderly persons living near levee breaches in the Lower Ninth Ward and Lakeview neighborhoods.

Aftermath

Civil disturbances

The aftermath of Hurricane Katrina was characterized by extensive reporting of looting, violence, murder and rape. While some criminal acts did occur, such as the emptying of an entire Walmart, many reports were also exaggerated, inflated, or simply fabricated. Several news organizations went on to issue retractions.

There were reports of snipers taking potshots at rescue helicopters; these were false. Reports of gangs roving the city shooting police officers and survivors were also false, as only one policeman was shot in the aftermath of Katrina and no indictments were brought forward against the supposed gang members.

Many reported instances of "looting" were in fact stranded survivors scavenging necessary supplies such as food, water, clothing, and shelter. Some instances of looting were later found out to have been carried out by a small number of NOPD officers.

Civil disturbances in post-Hurricane Katrina were consistent with all existing research on disaster sociology, which concludes that "[post-disaster] widespread looting [is] a myth", and were vastly overstated by the media, ultimately fueling a climate of suspicion and paranoia which greatly hampered rescue efforts and further worsened the conditions of the survivors.

Some initial reports of crime and mass chaos, particularly in stories about the Superdome, were later found to be exaggerated or rumors. In the Superdome, for example, the New Orleans sex crimes unit investigated every report of rape or atrocity and found only two verifiable incidents, both of sexual assault. The department head told reporters, "I think it was an urban myth. Any time you put 25,000people under one roof, with no running water, no electricity and no information, stories get told." Based on these reports, government officials expected hundreds of dead to be found in the Superdome, but instead found only six dead: four natural deaths, one drug overdose, and one suicide. In a case of reported sniper fire, the "sniper" turned out to be the relief valve of a gas tank popping every few minutes.

Additional acts of unrest occurred following the storm, particularly with the New Orleans Police Department. In the aftermath, a tourist asked a police officer for assistance, and got the response, "Go to hell, it's every man for himself." Also, one-third of New Orleans police officers deserted the city in the days before the storm, many of them escaping in their department-owned patrol cars. This added to the chaos by stretching law enforcement thin. Several NOPD officers were arrested weeks after Katrina for suspicion of vehicle theft.

Gretna controversy

The City of Gretna on the West Bank of the Mississippi River received considerable press coverage when, in the aftermath of Hurricane Katrina (late August 2005), displaced and dehydrated survivors who attempted to escape from New Orleans by walking over the Crescent City Connection bridge over the Mississippi River were turned back at gunpoint by City of Gretna Police, along with Crescent City Connection Police and Jefferson Parish Sheriff's deputies, who set up a roadblock on the bridge in the days following the hurricane.

Re-establishing governance

By September 1, 6,500 National Guard troops had arrived in New Orleans, and on September 2 Blanco requested a total of 40,000 for assistance in evacuation and security efforts in Louisiana.  In addition, the Louisiana State Guard and state defense forces from several states were activated to aid the National Guard in sheltering the large number of refugees leaving Louisiana and assist in other disaster recovery operations.

Some concern over the availability and readiness of the Louisiana National Guard to help stabilize the security situation was raised. Guardsman Lieutenant Colonel Pete had commented that "dozens of high water vehicles, humvees, refuelers, and generators were abroad." At the time of the hurricane, approximately 3,000 members of the Guard were serving a tour of duty in Iraq. With total personnel strength of 11,000, this meant that 27% of the Louisiana National Guard was abroad. However, both the White House and the Pentagon argued that the depletion of personnel and equipment did not impact the ability of the Guard to perform its mission—rather, impassable roads and flooded areas were the major factors impeding the Guardsmen from securing the situation in New Orleans.

Before Hurricane Katrina, the murder rate in New Orleans was ten times higher than the U.S. average. After the situation in New Orleans was brought under control, criminal activity in New Orleans dropped significantly.<ref>Ripley, Amanda. "What Happened to the Gangs of New Orleans? " Time magazine. May 22, 2006.</ref>

In response to the increase in criminal activity in New Orleans, makeshift prisons were constructed to house prisoners for short periods of time. Camp Greyhound was a temporary prison that housed more than 200 suspected looters in New Orleans until they could be transferred to other institutions. With room for 700 prisoners, the facility was guarded by officers from one of the United States' toughest prisons, the Louisiana State Penitentiary at Angola.  The station's bus terminals were converted into chain-link prison cells that could hold up to fifteen prisoners each. These prisoners were kept in conditions that included a portable toilet and military issued meals, but excluded a mattress or cot.

Law enforcement constructed the necessary offices of a police station in the general areas of the bus station, which included the offices of the District Attorney and the Justice Department. Camp Greyhound did have several issues with police records due to flooding, and prisoners who had committed minor infractions were kept in the same areas as those with more serious allegations. The facility was run on backup generators and outdated fingerprinting methods were used, which added to the confusion of the facility.

The Superdome

Evacuees were brought to the Superdome, one of the largest structures in the city, to wait out the storm or to await further evacuation. Many others made their way to the Superdome on their own, hoping to find food, water, shelter, or transport out of town. As Katrina passed over New Orleans on August 29, it ripped two holes in the Superdome roof. On the evening of August 30, Maj. Gen. Bennett C. Landreneau of the Louisiana National Guard said that the number of people taking shelter in the Superdome had risen to around 15,000 to 20,000 as search and rescue teams brought more people to the Superdome from areas hard-hit by the flooding.

Population density, lack of food and facilities, and structural damage led to increasingly squalid conditions for survivors. The situation inside the building was described as chaotic; reports of rampant drug use, fights, rapes, and filthy living conditions were widespread. At the time, as many as 100 were reported to have died in the Superdome, with most deaths resulting from heat exhaustion, but other reported incidents included an accused rapist who was beaten to death by a crowd and an apparent suicide. The reports appear to have been exaggerated: The final official death toll in the Superdome came to six people inside (4 of natural causes, one overdose, and an apparent suicide) and a few more in the general area outside the stadium.

On August 31, as flood waters continued to rise, Governor Blanco ordered that all of New Orleans, including the Superdome, be evacuated. Governor Blanco sent 68 school buses to transport the evacuating people.
FEMA announced that, in conjunction with Greyhound, the National Guard, and Houston Metro, the 25,000 people at the Superdome would be relocated across state lines to the Houston Astrodome. Roughly 475 buses were provided by FEMA to transport evacuees, with the entire operation taking 2–3 days. By September 4, the Superdome had been completely evacuated.

Although the Superdome suffered damage by water and wind to the overall interior and exterior structures, as well as interior damage from human waste and trash, the facility was repaired at a cost of US$185 million and was ready for games by the autumn of 2006.

New Orleans Convention Center
Because of Hurricane Katrina, the Ernest N. Morial Convention Center suffered a loss of water access and electricity, and one of its convention halls had a large hole in its ceiling. The center was otherwise only lightly damaged.

Captain M.A. Pfeiffer of the NOPD was quoted as saying, "It was supposed to be a bus stop where they dropped people off for transportation. The problem was, the transportation never came." By the afternoon of the 29th, the crowd had grown to about 1,000 people. The convention center's president (who was there with a small group of convention center employees at this time) addressed the crowd near dark, informing them that there was no food, water, medical care, or other services. By late on the evening of the 29th, the convention center had been broken into, and evacuees began occupying the inside of the convention center.

A contingent of 250 National Guard engineering units occupied one part of the convention center beginning August 30 and remained there until September 1, at times barricaded in their location. The units were never given orders to control the crowd, and were not expected to be prepared for such a task, as engineering units. The number of people at the convention center continued to grow over the next three days by some estimates to as many as 20,000 people. Reasons for arriving included being sent to the convention center from the overwhelmed Superdome, being dropped off there by rescuers, or hearing about the convention center as a shelter via word of mouth. No checking for weapons was done among the crowd as was done at the Superdome, and a large store of alcohol kept at the Convention Center was looted. Reports of robberies, murder, and rapes began to surface,Burnett, John. "More Stories Emerge of Rapes in Post-Katrina Chaos ." National Public Radio. December 21, 2005. in particular that a 14-year-old girl had been raped and that seven dead bodies were lying on the third floor.  In general, those who died, regardless of cause of death, were not moved or removed and were left to decompose.

By September 1, the facility, like the Superdome, was completely overwhelmed and declared unsafe and unsanitary. However, even though there were thousands of people who were evacuating at the center, along with network newscasters, pleading desperately for help on CNN, FOX, and other broadcast outlets, FEMA head Michael Brown and Homeland Security Secretary Michael Chertoff both claimed that they had no knowledge of the usage of the Convention Center as a shelter until the afternoon of September 1.

A sizable contingent of National Guard arrived on September 2 to establish order and provide essential provisions, and on September 3, buses began arriving at the convention center to pick up the refugees there. The Convention Center was completely evacuated by September 4.

 Charity Hospital 
Charity Hospital had most of its windows blown out and suffered damage to lights and ceiling tiles as a result of the strong winds caused by Katrina. Later that day, floodwaters began to fill up the building, which caused the main generators to fail, so the hospital staff decided to evacuate everyone to the auditorium. Conditions in the auditorium began to deteriorate, so everyone was evacuated to the roof. On September 1, the first 100 medically ill patients were taken on Sikorsky UH-60 Black Hawk helicopters to Baton Rouge. The remaining persons were evacuated the next day at about 3 pm. Eight people had died. Reports stated that some people were so desperate for food and water that they used intravenous therapy to receive nutrients.

Evacuation efforts

On August 31, a public health emergency was declared for the entire Gulf Coast, and Louisiana Governor Kathleen Blanco ordered a mandatory evacuation of all those remaining in New Orleans. Relief organizations scrambled to locate suitable areas for relocating evacuees on a large scale. Many people in the Superdome were bussed to Reliant Park in Houston, Texas. Houston agreed to shelter an additional 25,000 evacuees beyond those admitted to the Astrodome, including one "renegade bus" that was commandeered by private citizen Jabbar Gibson, who had been released on bond from the Orleans Parish Prison just days before the storm hit, and had a previous criminal conviction. By September 1, the Astrodome was declared full and could not accept any more evacuees. The George R. Brown Convention Center and the Reliant Center and Reliant Arena nearby were all opened to house additional evacuees. By September 2, the Reliant Center had 3,000 evacuees. San Antonio, Texas also agreed to house 25,000 refugees, initiating relocation efforts in vacant office buildings on the grounds of KellyUSA, a former air force base. Reunion Arena in Dallas, Texas was also mobilized to house incoming evacuees, and smaller shelters were established in towns across Texas and Oklahoma. Arkansas also opened various shelters and state parks throughout the state for evacuees.

Expected to last only two days, the evacuation of remaining evacuees proved more difficult than rescue organizations anticipated as transportation convoys struggled with damaged infrastructure and a growing number of evacuees. On September 3, the Texas Air National Guard reported that 2,500 evacuees were still at the Superdome. However, by evening, eleven hours after evacuation efforts began, the Superdome held 10,000 more people than it did at dawn. Evacuees from across the city swelled the crowd to about 30,000, believing the arena was the best place to get a ride out of town.

Evacuation efforts were hastened on September 2 by the wider dispersal of evacuees among newly opened shelters. Louis Armstrong International Airport was reopened to allow flights related to relief efforts, and began to load evacuees onto planes as well.

Elements of the 82nd Airborne Division arrived in New Orleans September 3. The flooding was a challenge for the paratroopers when they first arrived. The division had just four boats at the time, however, the division quickly started getting Coast Guard, Navy and Marine assets placed under their control. Army Maj. Gen. William B. Caldwell IV, the 82nd's commanding general, noted: "We eventually became the 82nd 'Waterborne' Division," the general said, "and that really was our forte" during search-and-rescue and security missions in flooded sections of the city.

Task Force Katrina Commander Army Lt. Gen. Russel Honoré also charged the paratroopers to straighten out the evacuation situations at the New Orleans Airport, the Convention Center and the Superdome. In all, 3,600 of the division's paratroopers were deployed to New Orleans to participate in Task Force All-American. The unit worked in tandem with state, local and other federal authorities to feed, process and transport evacuees to other accommodations; the division's soldiers helped evacuate 6,000 New Orleans residents. By September 18, the 82nd Division medical personnel had treated 1,352 people and given 2,047 immunizations, according to unit documents. By September 19, 82nd Division military engineers had cleared 185 city blocks of debris, cleared 113 streets, and removed 218 trees, according to unit documents.

On September 3, some 42,000 evacuees were evacuated from New Orleans, including those remaining in the Superdome and Convention Center. Efforts turned to the hundreds of people still trapped in area hotels, hospitals, schools and private homes. During the evacuation, one person was killed and 7 others injured when the bus in which they were heading to Texas overturned on Interstate 49 in Opelousas, LA. Opelousas Police lieutenant Dwain Grimmett said the bus driver lost control on dry pavement.

On September 6, Mayor Ray Nagin ordered a forced evacuation of everyone from the city who was not involved in clean up work, citing safety and health concerns. The order was given not only as an attempt to restore law and order but also out of concern about the hazardous living conditions in the city. Eviction efforts escalated three days later when door-to-door searches were conducted to advise remaining residents to leave the city. Despite this, a number of residents defied the eviction order. While initially lax in enforcing evictions, National Guard troops eventually began to remove residents by force.

 Orleans Parish Prison 
During Hurricane Katrina, Orleans Parish Prison housed a total of 7,100 inmates. There were inmates who were serving weekend time due to public intoxication all the way to convicted murderers. There were many inmates who just began their sentences when Katrina hit the city. After the hurricane made landfall, most of the city's power was affected, which caused the prison to lose power as well. During this outage, many of the prisoners were locked in their cells due to the doors solely opening electronically.  After being left in the dark due to the wind damage, the breaking of levees throughout the city flooded New Orleans and affected the prison. These prisoners were left by guards and deputies alike in the prison with chest high water and no food or water.  Due to the lack of power, the inmates took it upon themselves to start fires in the facility despite lack of ventilation.  Though most left, there were some prison guards who stayed in the city during the storm.  These guards allegedly assaulted the prisoners during this time. Many prisoners were shot, beaten, and maced. The prisoners feared for their lives during these encounters with the guards. The inmates endured these living conditions for three to five days before being relocated by officials. Once official teams came in to rescue the prisoners, they were all moved to I-10, the major interstate in New Orleans. Inmates who were not able to be easily rescued were left in the prison.  While located on I-10, the inmates were given water and food, though for some this was given too late.  There were many inmates who passed out due to dehydration.  The police brutality also remained high while prisoners were on the interstate.  Guards would shoot at the prisoners for any outburst and continue to beat them similar to conditions in Orleans Parish Prison.  While the inmates continued to endure these conditions, there were a total of six public defenders who were managing the cases of all of New Orleans prisoners.  The prisoners were later sent off to different prisons around the state of Louisiana while the city was still underwater. After the flood waters receded, many of the inmates of Orleans Parish Prison served longer sentences due to the lack of government in New Orleans and public defender staff shortages. The Criminal Justice System was out of order in the city for months and did not release its first prisoner on bond until October 2006.

Health effects

There was a concern that the prolonged flooding would lead to an outbreak of health problems for those who remained in the city. In addition to dehydration and food poisoning, there was also potential for the spread of hepatitis A, cholera, tuberculosis, and typhoid fever, all related to the growing contamination of food and drinking water supplies in the city compounded by the city's characteristic heat and stifling humidity.  Survivors could also face long-term health risks due to prolonged exposure to the petrochemical tainted flood waters and mosquito-borne diseases such as yellow fever, malaria, and West Nile fever.

On September 2, an emergency triage center was set up at the airport. A steady stream of helicopters and ambulances brought in the elderly, sick, and injured. Baggage equipment was used as gurneys to transport people from the flight line to the hospital, which was set up in the airport terminal. The scene could be described as, "organized chaos", but efficient. By September 3, the situation started to stabilize. Up to 5,000 people had been triaged and fewer than 200 remained at the medical unit.

Hospital evacuations continued from other area hospitals that were flooded or damaged. Reports from the Methodist Hospital indicated that people were dying of dehydration and exhaustion while the staff worked constantly in horrendous conditions. The first floor of the hospital flooded and the dead were stacked in a second floor operating room. Patients requiring ventilators were kept alive with hand-powered resuscitation bags.

Among the many hospitals shut down by damage related to the hurricane was the public hospital serving New Orleans, Charity Hospital, which was also the only trauma center serving that region. The destruction of the hospital's structure has forced the continued closure as funding for a new building is sought out.

 Pediatric evacuation 
Multiple children's hospitals around the United States including Arkansas Children's Hospital, Texas Children's Hospital, Children's of Alabama, Le Bonheur Children's Hospital, Cook Children's Medical Center, and Children's Mercy Kansas City sent helicopters, fixed wing aircraft, ambulances, and personnel to Tulane Medical Center, Ochsner, and CHNOLA in order to help evacuate pediatric patients from the hospital.

Economy

Before Katrina's landfall in 2005, the economy of New Orleans relied heavily on its usefulness and income derived from being a port city. The population grew and the economy peaked in the late 19th century. However, in the recent years, after rapid industrialization and the development of faster methods of transporting goods, the economy of New Orleans has been in a steady decline. As a result, New Orleans came to rely on three major industries for economic revenue: transportation, entertainment, and public services. However, after Katrina's landfall, these sectors, including the overall economy, were reduced and heavily affected by the natural disaster.

After the hurricane, the labor force diminished and wages decreased by staggering amounts. In July 2005, 9,592 people applied for unemployment services and the payroll of metropolitan firms declined by 13.6% between July 2005 and July 2007, indicating an estimated loss of 70,000 jobs. The sectors most affected were service-related industries, fluctuating with the population. The only sector to truly thrive after landfall was construction, which was in high demand to make needed repairs and rebuild destroyed homes.

In the first initial months following Katrina, the labor force reduced faster than the demand and unemployment rates skyrocketed. However, as of September 2006, the unemployment rates have never fallen below the national average, indicating improvement. In the second quarters of both 2005 and 2007, the firms' wages were increased by 21%, twice more than national increases, indicating even further improvement, although the gains were varied across the sectors.

There have been some suggestions concerning the usage of natural capital to further aid New Orleans's economy. One such proposal is to avoid rebuilding on flooded lands, instead restoring acres of wetlands to profit from the economic wealth. The Mississippi Delta provides the United States with one of the largest fisheries and the most important flyway terminus, enabling New Orleans to profit from these ecological industries. Furthermore, by increasing the wetlands, it would help create a natural barrier that could aid New Orleans in future storms. It is estimated that if New Orleans was to restore  of wetland lost before 2005, the natural capital would be worth an estimated $6 billion/year, or $200 billion at the present value. While New Orleans has made numerous efforts in rebuilding their economy, and has been successful with tourist-attracting events such as Mardi Gras, the natural capital provided could further assist the city in returning to its pre-Katrina wealth and economy.

Racial disparities

Following Katrina, many said that the hurricane had greater impact on black and less economically privileged people than it had on predominantly white and wealthier people. "The city’s remarkable recovery has, to a troubling degree, left behind the African-Americans who still make up the majority of its population," according to FiveThirtyEight. They based this on statistics showing that black residents of New Orleans are more likely to be unemployed than when the storm hit, and are also more likely to be living in poverty. Household incomes of black people have also fallen, and the wage gap between black and white people has grown.

About 175,000 black residents departed New Orleans over the year following the storm, while only 100,000 returned, pushing the African American population to 59 percent, from 66 percent previously. The biggest impact has been on the middle-class black people, given that most black professionals are older and more advanced in their careers, and the majority of the affluent and middle class are white.

These setbacks to the black population in New Orleans corresponded with a large number of educated white arrivals, contributing to a high rate of business formation in the city. These newcomers have had the effect of driving up housing prices, making rent less affordable for the majority of black residents.

The influence of black people in the city receded politically, too: in 2010 New Orleans elected its first white mayor in 32 years, a white majority (5–2) took control of the City Council, which had previously been black, and a white police chief and district attorney were elected. Lance Hill of Tulane University said: "The perception among most African-Americans is that they are living politically as a defeated group in their own city."

After Hurricane Katrina, many African-Americans suffered from mental illnesses—such as PTSD—at higher rates than their white counterparts. Populations experiencing mental illnesses, especially after a natural disaster, is not uncommon. African-Americans, however, "had approximately two-fold greater odds of screening positive for PTSD" after Hurricane Katrina than white people. It is deduced that African-Americans exhibit PTSD at higher frequencies than white people because they "were more likely to experience frequent mental distress." For example, African-Americans "report more negative events and chronic stressors--witnessing violence, receiving bad news, death events, lifetime major discrimination, daily discrimination--than whites, which negatively affects their mental health." African-Americans "are more segregated than any other racial/ethnic group in the United States, and racial segregation is associated with poorer quality housing and neighborhoods that have limited resources to enhance health and well-being." Another study found that the "[b]lack race was associated with greater symptom severity" of PTSD than other races. It is known that "[m]inority status itself has been shown to increase the risk of PTSD after trauma, though this effect may be largely because of differential exposure to poverty in violence." Additionally, the "largely Black population of New Orleans bore a disproportionately heavy burden of pre disaster chronic disease complicated by inadequate health care access."

See also

 Disaster Recovery Personal Protection Act of 2006
 Effects of Hurricane Katrina in Mississippi
 Great Mississippi Flood of 1927
 Hurricane on the Bayou (film)
 New Orleans diaspora
 Posse Comitatus Act
 Reconstruction of New Orleans
 Seabrook Floodgate
 Six Flags New Orleans
 U.S. Army Corps of Engineers civil works controversies (New Orleans)
 When the Levees Broke (film)
 Zeitoun (book)

References

External links
Levees.Org (non-profit flood protection group in New Orleans)

 Photos taken of Hurricane Katrina's aftermath
 Video, aftermath of Hurricane Katrina
 NOVA scienceNOW: Hurricanes : New Orleans' unique vulnerability to hurricanes.
 U.S. Army Corps of Engineers Levee Maps
 Independent Levee Investigation Team Draft Report
 Orleans Parish Prison Before and After Katrina
 Sexual Assault During and After Hurricane Katrina 2005
 Village Voice essay on the flood 
 GiveThemBack.com A National Rifle Association documentary spotlighting firearm seizures following Hurricane Katrina.
 Chicago Tribune article on Katrina's destructive impact on jazz memorabilia
 "Hurricane Katrina: The Catastrophe that Uncovered America's Race and Class Issues" from Tulane University Graduate
 "The X-Codes: A Post-Katrina Postscript", by Dorothy Moye, Southern Spaces, August 26, 2009
 Four Years After Katrina, New Orleans Still Struggling to Recover from the Storm – video report by Democracy Now!''
 News Coverage, critical 26min. video compilation of cable news coverage as Katrina makes landfall – by Cultural Farming.
 Imagining New Orleans Oral History Project Collection. Yale Collection of Western Americana, Beinecke Rare Book and Manuscript Library.
 

Floods in Louisiana
New Orleans
Hurricane
2005 in Louisiana
21st century in New Orleans
Katrina New Orleans